Yakov Morozov (born 6 August 1985), better known by his stage name Rezone, is a Russian DJ, Tech-House, House music producer and Sound Designer.

Musical career 
Yakov was just 13 years old when he first tried to write electronic music. Since then all his free time between basketball training sessions was devoted to creating tracks.

In 2006, Rezone releases his debut single "Money!". In the same year the composition "128 Bass Killers Attack The Pop Industry" secures his success and recognition among fans of electronic music.

In 2007, track "Tribute to Mr. Toca Of Revenge Of A Bass Killer" is played in their mixes and radio shows by Bob Sinclar, Steve Lawler, and Benny Benassi.

In 2008, Yakov releases his first studio album "Follow Me" consisting of 13 tracks, a single "Singomakers" and collaborates with Afroboogie on a track "Twisted". In the same year Rezone debuts at the 24th place in the ranking of Top 100 DJ of Russia.

In 2009, Rezone wins the remix contest on track "Mannheim" by Mark Knight and becomes the first Russian artist of Toolroom Records. On July 15 of the same year, a remix of track "Eclipse" by Reza is released. The work was supported by Pete Tong in the cult program Essential selection on BBC Radio 1.

In September 2010, Rezone releases his second album "The Best Remixes From Rezone".

In 2011, Rezone wins DJ Magazine and Nowtrax remix competition ‘Remix Your Way To Asia’ on the track "Pentonville Blues" by Boy George, Glide & Swerve, and plays in Lotus club in Macau at DJ Mag's official party.

In 2011 CD single of Salme Dahlstrom - "C'Mon Y'All" inc. Rezone Remix enters Billboard charts. 
.
No.2 Breakout for hot Dance club play on Billboard Club Play, No.46 Billboard Dance Chart (Hot Shot Debut), No.4 Most added on RPM Radio.

In 2012, Rezone creates a sound design label Singomakers, whose sounds are used in various well-known compositions, movies, TV shows, etc. 

In 2012, Dutch music channel Dancetrippin TV recorded live set of Rezone at Kazantip Festival for episode #189.

In September 2014, Rezone debuts with a track "Moogulator" on Mixmash Records, a record label of a famous Dutch DJ and producer Laidback Luke, and with a track "Bounce" on a British label CR2 Records.

In 2015, Yakov releases "Freak You Well", one of his most significant tracks, and a cover version of Enjoy The Silence by Depeche Mode.

In November 2015, Rezone launches his "Rezonance Radio show".

In October 2016, Rezone remixes a track "THE HYPNOTIST" together with Zen Freeman and a famous British hypnotist Paul McKenna.

In 2017, Rezone presents "Alco-Shopoholic", a new track featuring a popular blogger and singer Trev Li, released on a Canadian label Big Fish Recordings.

In 2018, Yakov releases "Dirty Style", a collaboration with Twin Scream. Ahead of the official release, Dutch producer Laidback Luke made an unofficial remix of it and played it regularly during performances at Tomorrowland, Ultra Music Festival, EDC, etc.

On September 7, 2019, Rezone releases the official remix on a track "3Acid3" by Joachim Garraud, a French DJ and producer.

Singles and collaborations

Remixes

References

Living people
1985 births
Russian DJs
Russian house musicians
Russian producers